Edmilson Jesus Moreira Mendes (born 8 May 1997), better known as Elvis Mendes, is a Cape Verdean professional footballer who plays as a defender for the Portuguese club Louletano.

International career
Mendes was called up to represent the Cape Verde national team in May 2018 for two international friendlies. He made his debut in a 0-0 (4-3) penalty shootout win over Andorra on 3 June 2018.

References

External links
 
 
 Maisfutebol Profile
 FPF Profile

1997 births
Living people
Cape Verdean footballers
Cape Verde international footballers
Campeonato de Portugal (league) players
C.F. Os Armacenenses players
Louletano D.C. players
Association football defenders
Cape Verdean expatriate footballers
Cape Verdean expatriate sportspeople in Portugal
Expatriate footballers in Portugal